Skoków  is a village in the administrative district of Gmina Opole Lubelskie, within Opole Lubelskie County, Lublin Voivodeship, in eastern Poland.

The village has a population of 232.

References

Villages in Opole Lubelskie County